Mozhdah Jamalzadah (born December 27, 1981 in Kabul, Afghanistan) is an Afghan singer, actress, and talk show host. Referred to as 'The Oprah of Afghanistan', Jamalzadah hosts The Mozhdah Show, which often touches on issues such as women's rights .

Early life 
During the civil war in Afghanistan, at the age of five, Jamalzadah and her family fled the country to neighbouring Pakistan.  Later the family would then move and settle in Canada.

Jamalzadah was raised in Vancouver, British Columbia, where she went on to study broadcast journalism at the British Columbia Institute of Technology, and Philosophy and Political Science at the University of British Columbia.

Rise to public recognition 
Jamalzadah began writing songs in the early 2000s, the most prominent of these, Dokhtare Afghan (Afghan Girl), became instantly popular on Afghan TV stations and airwaves. The song called attention to past stories of strong Afghan heroines got many young Afghan men and women. The song earned Jamalzadah nominations and awards at the Afghan and International TV and radio stations. As a result, in December 2009, she was offered a position to work with an up-and-coming television station in Afghanistan, 1TV.

The Mozhdah Show 
Mozhdah's political and philosophical studies gave her the drive to pursue more difficult ambitions. Once she joined 1TV, she decided she wanted to make her trip to Afghanistan fulfill her desire to make a difference. She became the host of "The Mozhdah Show" which later became the subject of international media. The concept of The Mozhdah Show was created after the Oprah Show, which gave Jamalzadah the title "Oprah of Afghanistan" by western media such as CNN and Time Magazine etc. On the Mozhdah Show, Jamalzadah and her producers created programming that addressed taboo topics in Afghan society, describing what it was like to be a woman, a child, and a person living in Afghan society. The Mozhdah Show also provided Mozhdah with the ability to explore and learn more about the current situation in Afghanistan through the eyes of Afghans.

On International Women's Day 2010, Mozhdah was asked to be the first Afghan to perform at the White House for the President, Barack Obama and First Lady Mrs. Obama, singing "Dokhtare Afghan", a song describing the bravery of Afghan women.

In 2019, she had an acting role in the drama film Red Snow and had a biography of her life released by Greystone Books entitled "Voice of Rebellion".

Awards
Excellence in the Arts CCLA Gala 2012 Toronto, Ontario, Canada (for outstanding commitment and contribution to a rich, diverse and dynamic Canada)
Best Light Song of the Year ATN Awards (2010)
Best Female Artist ATN Awards (2012)

References

External links

  
 Mozhdah's Label

1982 births
Living people
People from Herat
People from Kabul
Afghan Tajik people
Afghan women singers
Canadian women singers
Persian-language singers
English-language singers
Musicians from Vancouver
Afghan emigrants to Canada
Afghan expatriates in Canada
21st-century Canadian singers
21st-century Canadian women singers